Viva! Health, formerly The Vegetarian and Vegan Foundation (VVF), founded by Juliet Gellatley (along with Viva!), is a science-based health and nutrition charity. Viva! Health monitors and interprets the growing body of research linking diet and health. Viva! Health provides information and advice about healthy eating. Viva! Health also runs health and education campaigns, presents school talks, cookery demonstrations, contributes to the magazine Viva!life and produces a wide variety of materials, including the free online Vegetarian Recipe Club. Viva! Health also answers nutritional queries from the public, industry and health sector and publishes diet and health-related stories regularly in national, regional and specialist press.

Celebrity supporters
 Tony Benn
 Tony Wardle - Viva! associate director and editor
 Jerome Flynn
 Chrissie Hynde
 Joanna Lumley
 Michael Mansfield QC
 Sir Paul McCartney
 Heather Mills
 Hayley Mills
 Jenny Seagrove
 Martin Shaw
 Wendy Turner Webster
 Benjamin Zephaniah
 Cindy Jackson
 Jeremy Cunningham
 10,000 Things
 John Feldmann
 Rose Elliot

See also
 The Vegan Society

References

External links
 
 

Vegetarian organizations
Vegan organizations
1994 establishments in the United Kingdom
Vegetarianism in the United Kingdom

da:Viva!
pl:Fundacja Viva!